Pasewalk is a town in the Vorpommern-Greifswald district, in the state of Mecklenburg-Vorpommern in Germany. Located on the Uecker river, it is the capital of the former Uecker-Randow district, and the seat of the Uecker-Randow-Tal Amt, of which it is not part.

History
Pasewalk became a town during the 12th century and was soon a member of the Hanseatic League. In 1359 it passed to the Duke of Pomerania. Frequently ravaged during the wars which devastated the district, it was plundered several times by Imperial troops during the Thirty Years' War. In 1657 it was burned down by the Poles and in 1713 by the Russians. In the Peace of Westphalia in 1648 it was given to Sweden, but in 1676 it was conquered by Brandenburg. In 1720, in the Peace of Stockholm, it was finally assigned to Brandenburg-Prussia.
The town is famous for having been surrendered to the French without a fight during the War of the Fourth Coalition, despite them being way less numerous than the defenders of the city. On the day World War I ended, Adolf Hitler, the future dictator of Nazi Germany, was being treated here after being wounded by a gas attack. During the Battle of Berlin, part of World War II, Pasewalk was captured by troops of the 2nd Belorussian Front of the Red Army on 28 April 1945.

Mayors of Pasewalk
1905–1917 Wilhelm Prüter 
1917–1937 Dr. Willy Peppler (1880-1957)
1937–1942  Malsfey 
1942  Klingbeil 
1942–? Hans-Heinrich Wentzlaff-Eggebert (born 1894, died ?)
1945–? Hermann Bülow 
1945–1949 Erich Pretzer (1882-1968)
1950–1961 Helene Medrow (1902-1976)
1961–1974 Eberhard Schmidt (1924-2010)
around 1982  Börner 
1986–1990 Bärbel Steinmüller (born 1948)
1990–1994 Heinz-Georg Eckleben (born 1945), independent
1994–2002 Wilfried Sieber (born 1941), CDU
2002–2014 Rainer Dambach (1952-2013), independent
November 2013-May 2014 Gudrun Baganz, temporary
May 2014 - May 2022 Sandra Nachtweih (born 1975), independent
since May 2022 Danny Rodewald (born 1979), independent

Population over time

Born in Pasewalk

 Wilhelm von Tümpling (1809-1884), Prussian General of the Infantry
 Georg von Kameke (1817-1893), Prussian General of the Infantry and War Ministers
 Erich Paulun (1862-1909), founder of the Tongji Hospital Shanghai, former naval surgeon
 Erich Hamann (born 1944), German footballer and former player of the GDR national football team
 Rainer Knaak (born 1953), German chess player
 Sabine Zimmermann (born 1960), German politician
 Chris Gueffroy (1968-1989), penultimate death victim on the Berlin Wall

Climate
Köppen-Geiger climate classification system classifies its climate as oceanic (Cfb).

International relations

Pasewalk is twinned with:

 : Halen
 : Norden
 : Police

External links

References

Vorpommern-Greifswald
Members of the Hanseatic League
Populated places established in the 13th century
1250s establishments in the Holy Roman Empire
1251 establishments in Europe